Note: In this article, to distinguish between the Han state of the Warring States period and the Han dynasty, the former is referred to as "Hán" while "Han" is reserved for the latter.

Zhang Liang ( 251 BC – 189 BC), courtesy name Zifang, was a Chinese military strategist and politician who lived in the early Western Han dynasty. He is also known as one of the "Three Heroes of the early Han dynasty", along with Han Xin and Xiao He. Zhang Liang contributed greatly to the establishment of the Han dynasty. After his death, he was honoured with the posthumous title "Marquis Wencheng" by Emperor Qianshao. Zhang Liang is depicted in the Wu Shuang Pu (無雙譜, Table of Peerless Heroes) by Jin Guliang.

Early life
Zhang Liang was born in Xinzheng (新鄭; present-day Zhengzhou, Henan), the capital of the Hán state(), while his ancestral home was in Chengfu (城父; present-day Chengfu Town, Bozhou, Anhui). He descended from an aristocrat family in Hán. His grandfather served three generations of the Hán rulers as chancellors while his father served two generations. Zhang Liang missed the opportunity to inherit his family's legacy as the Hán state was annexed by the Qin state in 230 BC as part of Qin's wars of unification.

As a fugitive

Assassination attempt on Qin Emperor 
To avenge the fall of his native state, Zhang Liang dedicated his efforts to hiring assassins to kill the First Emperor of Qin. He spent his entire family fortune and failed to give his deceased younger brother a proper funeral. He managed to find a man with great physical strength to help him, and had an iron hammer weighing 120 catties (roughly 160 lbs. or 72 kg) forged for the strongman. In 218 BC, Zhang Liang heard that the emperor was going to Yangwu County (east of present-day Yuanyang County, Henan) as part of his inspection tour, and was due to pass by Bolangsha during the journey.

Zhang Liang and the strongman lay in ambush at Bolangsha and waited for the emperor's convoy to approach. They saw that all the carriages that passed by were pulled by four horses and believed that the most decorated one in the middle was the emperor's personal carriage. The strongman hurled the hammer towards it, and the heavy projectile hit and crushed the carriage, killing its occupants.  Zhang Liang fled from the scene during the ensuing chaos. However, the First Emperor was actually in the neighboring carriage and survived the assassination attempt, after which he ordered a massive manhunt for Zhang Liang. Zhang Liang eluded the dragnet for ten days by using fake identities.

Meeting Huang Shigong

As a wanted fugitive by the Qin government, Zhang Liang travelled to Xiapi and stayed there for some time, using fake identities to evade the authorities. One day, Zhang Liang took a stroll at Yishui Bridge and met an old man there. The man walked towards Zhang Liang and chucked his shoe down the bridge on purpose, after which he yelled at Zhang, "Hey boy, go down and fetch me my shoe!" Zhang Liang was astonished and offended, but obeyed silently out of courtesy. The old man then lifted his foot and ordered Zhang Liang to put on the shoe for him. Zhang Liang was furious but he controlled his temper and meekly obliged. The man did not show any sign of gratitude and walked away laughing.

As Zhang was brooding over the insult, the old man came back after walking a short distance and praised him, "This child can be taught!" He then told Zhang Liang to meet him at dawn at the bridge again in five days. Zhang Liang was confused but agreed. Five days later, Zhang Liang rushed to the bridge at the stroke of dawn but the old man was already waiting for him there. The old man chided him, "How can you be late for a meeting with an elderly man? Come back again five days later!" Zhang Liang tried his best to be punctual the second time but the old man still arrived earlier than him, and he was scorned once more and told to return again five days later. The third time, Zhang Liang went to the bridge at midnight and waited until the old man appeared. This time, the old man was impressed with Zhang Liang's fortitude and humility, that he presented Zhang with a book, saying, "You can become the tutor of a ruler after reading this book. Within ten years, the world will become chaotic. You can then use your knowledge from this book to bring peace and prosperity to the empire. Meet me again 13 years later. I'm the yellow rock at the foot of Mount Gucheng."

The old man was Huang Shigong (黃石公; lit. "Yellow Rock Old Man") . The book was titled The Art of War by Taigong and believed to be the Six Secret Teachings by Jiang Ziya, while some called it Three Strategies of Huang Shigong. In legend, Zhang Liang returned to the indicated site 13 years later and did see a yellow rock there. He built a shrine to worship the rock and the rock was buried with him after his death.

It is also said that Huang Shigong wrote the Lingqijing divination manual which was also given to Zhang Liang

Rebelling against the Qin dynasty
In 209 BC, during the reign of Qin Er Shi, several uprisings erupted throughout China to overthrow the Qin dynasty. Many of these rebel forces claimed to be restoring the former states that were annexed by Qin two decades ago. Zhang Liang rallied about 100 men to start a rebellion as well, but his force was too weak, so he led his followers to join Jing Ju, a pretender to the throne of the former Chu state. He met Liu Bang during his journey and was impressed with Liu's charisma that he changed his decision and joined Liu instead. Zhang Liang became a temporary advisor to Liu Bang and followed Liu to join Xiang Liang's rebel force.

The following year, Xiang Liang installed Mi Xin as King Huai II of Chu after eliminating Jing Ju. Zhang Liang's main goal was to reestablish his native state of Hán, so he managed to persuade Xiang Liang to do the same for the Hán state. Han Cheng, a descendant of the royal family of Hán, was enthroned as King of Hán, while Zhang Liang was appointed as the Hán's chancellor. Han Cheng's armies attempted to capture Qin cities that were formerly Hán territories but did not achieve much success and engaged in guerrilla warfare for about a year. Later that year, Xiang Liang was killed in action at the Battle of Dingtao and King Huai II put Xiang Yu (Xiang Liang's nephew) and Liu Bang each in charge of an army to attack Qin, promising that whoever entered Guanzhong (heartland of Qin) first would be conferred the title of "King of Guanzhong".

In 207 BC, the combined forces of Liu Bang and Han Cheng conquered Yangzhai (present-day Yuzhou City, Henan), the former capital of the Hán state. Han Cheng stayed behind to defend Yangzhai, while Zhang Liang served as a temporary advisor to Liu Bang. Zhang Liang contributed to Liu Bang's eventual victory in the race to Guanzhong for the strategies he proposed. For example, at the battle of Yao Pass, Zhang Liang suggested tricking the Qin commander into surrendering by bribing him with gifts. Liu Bang wanted to accept the surrendered Qin troops into his army but Zhang Liang cautioned him, saying that some of the troops were unwilling to surrender even though their commander agreed. That night, Liu Bang's forces caught the Qin army off guard and scored a major victory. In another incident, Zhang Liang warned Liu Bang against making a detour at Wancheng, because they would be at risk of being surrounded by the enemy if Liu did so.

Chu–Han Contention

Feast at Hong Gate

Upon entering the Epang Palace in Xianyang (the Qin capital), Liu Bang was strongly tempted by the riches it housed and wanted to stay there forever. Zhang Liang reminded Liu Bang about overindulgence in sensual pleasures and Liu ordered his men to seal the treasures and move to Bashang to wait for Xiang Yu and the other rebel forces to arrive. During this period of time, Liu Bang heeded Zhang Liang's advice and governed Guanzhong with benevolence, restoring peace and stability, and forbidding his men from pillaging the cities and harming the common people.

In 206 BC, Xiang Yu's army arrived at Hangu Pass (eastern gateway to Guanzhong) and Liu ordered his men to prevent Xiang's forces from entering Guanzhong. Xiang Yu was furious when he learnt that Liu Bang had beat him in the race to Guanzhong, and he wanted to kill Liu after being instigated by Fan Zeng and a defector from Liu's side, Cao Wushang. Xiang Yu's uncle, Xiang Bo, was an old friend of Zhang Liang and he secretly warned Zhang that Xiang Yu was planning to attack Liu Bang. Liu Bang was shocked and fearful when he heard that, as his forces were too weak to counter Xiang Yu. Zhang Liang advised Liu Bang to attend the Feast at Hong Gate hosted by Xiang Yu, to put Xiang off guard and dismiss Xiang's suspicions that Liu was intending to oppose him. With help from Xiang Bo, Liu Bang managed to survive the dangerous banquet and Xiang Yu dismissed the idea of killing Liu. However, Fan Zeng was dissatisfied and he asked Xiang Yu's cousin Xiang Zhuang to pretend to perform a sword dance and use the opportunity to kill Liu Bang. Xiang Bo intervened again and saved Liu Bang's life.

Meanwhile, Zhang Liang left the tent to find Fan Kuai to save Liu Bang. Following Zhang Liang's instructions, Fan Kuai burst in and openly chided Xiang Yu, making a speech about Liu Bang's accomplishments and affirming that Liu had no intention of opposing Xiang Yu. Liu Bang left the banquet later on the pretext of going to the latrine and was received by Xiahou Ying, who had been waiting nearby on Zhang Liang's instruction. Zhang Liang remained behind to hold Xiang Yu's attention while Liu Bang escaped. Before leaving, Zhang Liang presented Xiang Yu and Fan Zeng with a pair of jade pieces.

Eighteen Kingdoms

Xiang Yu split the former Qin Empire into the Eighteen Kingdoms later, granting the land of Guanzhong to three surrendered Qin generals, even though Guanzhong was rightfully Liu Bang's, according to King Huai II's earlier promise. Liu Bang was relocated to the remote Bashu region (in present-day Sichuan) instead and granted the title of "King of Han". Han Cheng retained his rulership as King of Hán and Zhang Liang was moved from Liu Bang's side back to Hán to continue serving as chancellor. Before parting ways, Liu Bang presented Zhang Liang with some gold and pearls, all of which Zhang gave to Xiang Bo. Zhang Liang also urged Liu Bang to destroy the gallery roads leading to Bashu during the journey to Hanzhong, in order to reduce Xiang Yu's suspicions that Liu was planning to return and challenge him.

Although Han Cheng was the king of Hán, Xiang Yu did not permit him to govern his kingdom and forced him to accompany him back to his Western Chu's capital of Pengcheng (present-day Xuzhou, Jiangsu). Han Cheng was demoted to "Marquis of Rang" later and killed on Xiang Yu's orders. Xiang Yu seized Han Cheng's kingdom and made his subordinate Zheng Chang the new King of Hán. Zhang Liang was still the chancellor of Hán under the new arrangement but he was aware of his precarious position, and cognisant of how Xiang Yu had destroyed his hope of restoring the Hán state. Zhang Liang fled from Hán later and returned to join Liu Bang in the winter of 206 BC. Liu Bang conferred on Zhang Liang the title of "Marquis of Chengxin" and Zhang became a permanent advisor to Liu from that time.

Conquest of the Three Qin and Battle of Pengcheng
Starting in 206 BC, after Liu Bang's forces conquered the Three Qins, Liu Bang and Xiang Yu engaged in a four-year-long power struggle for supremacy over China, historically known as the Chu–Han Contention. In 205 BC, Liu Bang was defeated by Xiang Yu at the Battle of Pengcheng and he retreated to Xiayi. Zhang Liang proposed a strategy to Liu Bang to counter Xiang Yu, known as the "Xiayi Plan". Liu Bang followed Zhang Liang's advice: he sent Xiao He to persuade Ying Bu to join him; contacted Peng Yue and allied with him; and allowed Han Xin to lead part of his army to attack other territories on the northern front.

In 204 BC, Liu Bang was trapped by Xiang Yu in Xingyang and both sides reached a stalemate. Li Yiji suggested to Liu Bang to recreate the former states of the Warring States period and install the descendants of their royal families on their respective thrones. This plan was intended to help Liu Bang gain the support of the vassal states' rulers, who would help him in the war against Xiang Yu. However, Zhang Liang disapproved of the plan as he felt that the states were more likely to support Western Chu instead as Chu was superior to Han in terms of military might. Liu Bang realised the problem and immediately dismissed Li Yiji's plan.

In 203 BC, after his victory at the Battle of Wei River, Han Xin conquered the Qi kingdom and sent a messenger to Liu Bang, requesting that Liu appoint him as the acting King of Qi. Liu was still trapped at Xingyang then and he was furious after hearing the request because he was expecting Han Xin to come to his aid. Zhang Liang reminded Liu Bang that if he refused to approve Han Xin's request, Han might be discontented and declare independence from Liu, putting them in a dangerous situation. Liu Bang reluctantly agreed and sent Zhang Liang to pass the king's seal to Han Xin. Zhang Liang met Han Xin and succeeded in reaffirming Han's loyalty to Liu Bang.

Battle of Gaixia
By late 203 BC, Zhang Liang saw that the tide had turned in favour of Liu Bang, as Xiang Yu had been surrounded on three sides. Together with Chen Ping, Zhang Liang suggested to Liu Bang to renounce the Treaty of Hong Canal and use the opportunity to eliminate Western Chu. However, at the Battle of Guling, Liu Bang was defeated by Xiang Yu because the expected reinforcements from Han Xin and Peng Yue did not arrive. Zhang Liang explained to Liu Bang that Han Xin and Peng Yue did not mobilise their troops because they did not have their fiefs yet, even though they had received their titles of vassal kings. Liu Bang followed Zhang Liang's advice and granted lands to Han Xin and Peng Yue. Two months later, as Zhang Liang predicted, Han Xin and Peng Yue arrived with their armies and formed a coordinated attack on Western Chu together with Liu Bang's force, defeating Xiang Yu at the Battle of Gaixia in 202 BC.

In service during the Han dynasty
In 202 BC, after his victory over Xiang Yu, Liu Bang ascended the throne and became historically known as "Emperor Gaozu of Han". Following the establishment of the Han dynasty, Zhang Liang remained as a key advisor to Gaozu even though he did not receive any formal appointment as a government minister. Together with Lou Jing, Zhang Liang later suggested for Gaozu to build his capital in Chang'an instead of Luoyang, as Chang'an was in a more strategic position than Luoyang (fertile land and surrounded by natural defences such as mountain passes). Once, Gaozu noticed that some of his subjects were having a secret discussion and he asked for Zhang Liang's opinion. Zhang Liang told Gaozu that they were plotting a rebellion and Gaozu was shocked. Zhang Liang proceeded to ask Gaozu whom of all his subjects he hated the most. Gaozu mentioned Yong Chi, who had rebelled against him before but surrendered later. Zhang Liang then suggested to Gaozu to grant Yong Chi a noble title, because if the others saw that Gaozu was able to forgive Yong Chi, they would be at ease and would not think of rebelling.

Subsequently, Zhang Liang retired from state affairs and practised Taoism. In late 201 BC, Gaozu rewarded his subjects who contributed to the dynasty's founding and he conferred the title of "Marquis of Liu" on Zhang Liang. In 196 BC, Gaozu left to suppress a rebellion by Ying Bu, and requested Zhang Liang to come out of retirement to assist the crown prince, Liu Ying, in governing the home territories. After returning from the campaign, Gaozu wanted to replace Liu Ying with Liu Ruyi, the Prince of Zhao. Zhang Liang opposed Gaozu's decision but Gaozu ignored him so Zhang feigned illness and retired again. When approached by Empress Lü Zhi to help Liu Ying retain his position, Zhang Liang recommended the Four Whiteheads of Mount Shang to help Liu Ying, and the four men succeeded in convincing Gaozu to keep Liu Ying as the crown prince. Zhang Liang remained in retirement until his death in 189 BC.

Death and burial place

Little is known about Zhang Liang's later life, hence his final resting place has been a mystery throughout history.

A Zhang Liang Tomb stands at 6 km southwest of present-day Lankao County, Henan. According to legend, during the Lü Clan Disturbance, Zhang Liang moved to Mount Baiyun at the southwest of Donghun County (present-day Lankao County, Henan), and was buried there after his death. A Zhang Liang Temple used to stand beside the tomb, but it was destroyed during the Cultural Revolution.

Another Zhang Liang Tomb stands at south of Weishan County, Shandong. The stone tablet in front of the grave bearing Zhang Liang's name was erected in 1737 during the Qing dynasty. A Zhang Liang Shrine also used to stand east of the tomb, but it was destroyed during the Cultural Revolution.

However, some believed that Zhang Liang's tomb was in present-day Pei County, Xuzhou. According to the 7th-century gazetteer Kuodi Zhi, Zhang Liang's tomb was 65 li east of Pei County, near Liucheng, where a Zhang Liang Temple was also located.

According to Xianshizhi and Lingmuzhi, Zhang Liang's tomb was at Mount Qingyan in Hunan.

Modern references

Zhang Liang's encounter with Huang Shigong had also become one of the classic Chinese folk tales about humility for later generations to learn from.

Zhang Liang is one of the 32 historical figures who appear as special characters in the video game Romance of the Three Kingdoms XI by Koei. He has higher intelligence stats than all these characters, except for Jiang Ziya. Zhang Liang is also a playable character of the "Wizard" class in the action RPG Prince of Qin.

Zhang Liang has been portrayed in various media set in the Chu–Han Contention, such as The Great Conqueror's Concubine, and The Last Supper, and Han's third assassination attempt before he became the Emperor in The Mummy: Tomb of the Dragon Emperor. He appears in the 2012 television series King's War.  He also appears as a character in the animation series The Legend of Qin.

References

General references
Sima Qian. Records of the Grand Historian, Volume 55.
Ban Gu et al. Book of Han, Volume 40.
Sima Guang. Zizhi Tongjian, volumes 7, 8, 9, 10, 11, 12.

186 BC deaths
Chu–Han contention people
Emperor Gaozu of Han
Han dynasty politicians from Henan
Qin dynasty people
Politicians from Zhengzhou
Year of birth unknown
Legendary Chinese people
Chinese military leaders